Piotr Karol Drzewiecki (29 April, 1950 – 17 March, 2022) was a Polish footballer who played as a defender. He made three appearances for the Poland national team in 1974.

He died in March 2022.

References

External links
 

1950 births
2022 deaths
Sportspeople from Chorzów
Polish footballers
Poland international footballers
Association football defenders
Ruch Chorzów players
Place of death missing